The  is a limestone quarry in the city of Hachinohe, Aomori Prefecture, in the northern Tohoku region of northern Japan. It is operated by the Sumimetal Mining Company.

The open pit has a north-south length of approximately 2 kilometers and an east-west width of 800 meters. The limestone excavated is transported by a 10 kilometer pipeline with belt conveyor to Port of Hachinohe. 

The mine is locally nicknamed the "Hachinohe Canyon."

See also
 Extreme points of Japan

References

External links
 The official website of Nittetsu Kosan, the parent company of Sumimetal Mining Company
Hachinohe Tourist Information

Extreme points of Japan
Geography of Aomori Prefecture
Hachinohe
Mines in Japan
Limestone industry